Dick is a ghost town in Weld County, in the U.S. state of Colorado.

History
The Denver & Boulder Valley Railroad built a rail line to Dick in 1870, and ran its first train to the settlement in December of that year. The rail line connected Boulder to Brighton, and was acquired by the Union Pacific Railroad in 1898. Dick was located adjacent to a railway siding, indicating that it was likely a train station at some point.

Coal mining had a significant presence in the Dick area. The Eagle Mine, which was to the west of Dick, opened in 1939. The Washington and Lincoln mines opened in 1940 and 1948 respectively. The Washington Mine closed in 1967, followed by the closures of the Eagle and Lincoln mines in 1978 and 1979 respectively. The closures of the coal mines likely contributed to the decline of Dick.

In 1966, a railroad bridge over the South Platte River, west of Brighton, was washed out in a flood. This severed rail connections to Brighton, and lead to the abandonment of the rail line east of Dick in 1967. By 1994, the rail line east of St Vrains was abandoned, cutting off Dick's railway access. The abandonment of the rail line led directly to Dick's desertion, which likely happened in the 1980s.

References

Unincorporated communities in Weld County, Colorado
Ghost towns in Colorado